The 2021 Baku Formula 2 round was the 3rd round of the 2021 Formula 2 Championship and took place at the Baku City Circuit from 4 to 6 June. It ran in support of the 2021 Azerbaijan Grand Prix and featured three races, including the 100th FIA Formula 2 race on June 5 for sprint race 2.

With Jüri Vips winning Sprint Race 2 and Feature Race respectively, it marked the first time in the series' history that a driver was able to win two races in a weekend.

Background
Matteo Nannini, who had previously withdrawn from Formula 2 to focus on the FIA Formula 3 Championship, was called in by Campos Racing to replace Gianluca Petecof.

Baku City Circuit 

 First race took place in 2017.
 Length: 6.003 KM
 Sprint Race 1: 21 Laps, 126.063 KM
 Sprint Race 2: 21 Laps, 126.063 KM
 Feature Race: 29 Laps, 174.087 KM
 Circuit Records: F2 Fastest Lap, 1:52.129 by Charles Leclerc (PREMA Racing) in 2017

Classification

Qualifying

Sprint race 1 

 Notes

  – Felipe Drugovich originally finished ninth, but was given a 10-second penalty for causing a collision with Liam Lawson on the first lap. He also received two penalty points.

Sprint race 2

Feature Race

 Notes

  - Matteo Nannini failed to start the Feature Race after stalling on the grid at the formation lap.
  - Oscar Piastri was given a five-second-time penalty for an unsafe release during his mandatory pit stop.

Standings after the event

Drivers' Championship standings

Teams' Championship standings

 Note: Only the top five positions are included for both sets of standings.

See also 
2021 Azerbaijan Grand Prix

References

External links 

 

Baku
Baku Formula 2
Baku Formula 2